Robert Key may refer to:

 Robert Key (cricketer) (born 1979), English cricketer
 Robert Key (politician) (1945–2023), British politician, Conservative MP for Salisbury 1983–2010

See also
 Robert Kee (1919–2013), British broadcaster, journalist and writer
 Robert Keyes (–1606), Catholic conspirator in the Gunpowder Plot
 Bobby Keys (1943–2014), American musician